Laura Valente, stage name of Laura Bortolotti (born 3 September 1963 in Milan), is an Italian singer and musician.

Early solo career 
After winning a songwriting contest with a song about a young victim of drug addiction as a teenager, Valente collaborated with Gianni Bella on his album G.B. 2 (1984), which led to her getting her first recording contract soon thereafter.

In 1985 she met singer Mango, starting a partnership in both music and life: he not only had Valente provide vocals for his albums Australia (1985), Odissea (1986), Inseguendo l'aquila (1988) and Sirtaki (1990), but also produced her first studio album Tempo di Blues (1986), which despite not selling well, was met with good reviews by the critics.

With Matia Bazar 
In 1990 she replaced Antonella Ruggiero as the lead singer of the famed group Matia Bazar; her first album with the band is Anime Pigre (1991), marking a switch to a more modern, rocking style.

Matia Bazar's participations in the Sanremo Music Festival in 1992 (with Piccoli Giganti, ranked #6) and 1993 (with Dedicato a te, ranked #4) were also a critical and commercial success, as well as their next albums Dove le canzoni si avverano (1993), Radiomatia (1995) and Benvenuti a Sausalito (1997).

After the death of Matia Bazar's bassist and main songwriter Aldo Stellita in 1998, however, Valente decided to leave the group to focus on her family.

Later solo career 
During the 2000s, Laura mainly collaborated with her by-then husband Mango, notably duetting with him on his song Chissà se nevica during the third night of Sanremo Music Festival 2007 on 1 March.

She has also been active in several theatrical productions.

Personal life
Valente was the partner of singer-songwriter Mango since 1985. They were married from 2004 to his death in 2014; their children Filippo (b. 1995) and Angelina (b. 1999) are also in the music business and have collaborated with their parents on several occasions.

Discography

Solo
 Tempo di Blues (1986)

With Matia Bazar
 Anime pigre (1991)
 Dove le canzoni si avverano (1993)
 Radiomatia (1995) 
 Benvenuti a Sausalito (1997)

Notes

External links
 

1963 births
Musicians from Milan
Italian women singer-songwriters
20th-century Italian women singers
21st-century Italian women singers
Living people